Sink or Swim is a puzzle video game that was released in 1993 for MS-DOS Developed by Zeppelin Games. It is similar in style to Lemmings. The game was ported to the Amiga and the Super Nintendo Entertainment System. Sega Genesis and Game Gear versions were renamed to S.S. Lucifer: Man Overboard!.

Plot 
Players control Kevin Codner, the aquatic hero. After hearing that the SS Lucifer has suffered some sort of mishap (the exact nature of the incident is not made clear in the game; somehow the captain is shown pulling the plug from his bath, and a fountain of water shoots up and starts flooding the ship). Kevin gets into a yellow submarine and begins saving the passengers.

Reception
Electronic Gaming Monthly gave the SNES version a 6.4 out of 10. They commented that the graphics could be better but that the gameplay is both strategic and addictive. GamePro took the reverse position, praising the graphics but criticizing the lack of multiplayer and concluding that the gameplay is not entertaining enough to captivate puzzle veterans.

References

External links

1993 video games
Amiga games
Atari ST games
DOS games
Platform games
Game Gear games
Sega Genesis games
Super Nintendo Entertainment System games
Video games developed in the United Kingdom
Single-player video games